DRMC may refer to:

Dhaka Residential Model College, an autonomous college in Bangladesh
Davao Regional Medical Center, a public hospital in the Philippines